The Immigration Department of the Government of Hong Kong is responsible for immigration control of Hong Kong. After the People's Republic of China assumed sovereignty of the territory in July 1997, Hong Kong's immigration system remained largely unchanged from its British predecessor model. Residents from mainland China do not have the right of abode in Hong Kong, nor can they enter the territory freely, both before and after 1997. There are different regulations that apply to residents of Macau, another Special Administrative Region of China. In addition, visa-free entry acceptance regulations into Hong Kong for passport holders of some 170 countries remain unchanged before and after 1997.

In a special arrangement, although Hong Kong's residents of Chinese descent are defined as citizens of the People's Republic of China, as stipulated by the Basic Law, Hong Kong's Immigration Department is responsible for issuing Hong Kong SAR passports for Hong Kong residents who are also PRC citizens seeking international travel.

History

Prior to the 1950s, immigration to Hong Kong was not controlled by the government of Hong Kong and migrants freely entered Hong Kong. By the end of World War II, the influx of migrants from China to Hong Kong to flee Communist rule resulted in immigration control.

From 1949 to 1961, registration of persons with identification was required under the Registration of Persons Ordinance 1949 and established a Commissioner of Registration.

Until the establishment of Immigration Department on 4 August 1961, immigration control in Hong Kong was handled by the Hong Kong Police Force. The Immigration Service Ordinance 1961 created the new department in charge of immigration control. Later in 1977, the department enlarged its functions to cover registration of persons by amalgamating with the Registration of Persons Office and Director of Immigration also assumed as Commissioner of Registration. In 1979, the department took over from the Registrar General civil registration duties and the Director of Immigration was appointed as Registrar of Births and Deaths, and Registrar of Marriages.

In 1975 - 1980s, Hong Kong government received up to 200,000 Vietnamese refugees with impacts on the economy, security, society, and searched for solutions. In the early 1987, one of the accommodated refugee boats received the assistance of the Immigration Department to depart to continue sailing. It arrived in Kinmen to apply for the asylum, but was rejected by the ROC military, then was slaughtered on the Lieyu Island on March 7. The boat was burnt with evidence destroyed, and the Hong Kong government-issued documents were hidden to cover up, later the ROC Ministry of National Defense repeatedly denied on the journalists' reportages and the parliament questioning, until being exposed by the publication of General Hau Pei-tsun's diary in 2000, known as the Lieyu Massacre.

In 2019, the department stopped allowing people to search birth or marital records without the consent of those being searched.

The department is headquartered in the Immigration Tower in Wan Chai North.

Roles 

The department performs the following roles:

 Immigration control at the checkpoints (Hong Kong International Airport as well as Mainland-Hong Kong port of entry)
 HK Resident Affairs (by Division of Registration of Persons)
 Issuing Hong Kong identity card (both permanent and non-permanent)
 Birth registration
 Death certification
 Marriage certification
 Registering/Denouncing Chinese citizenship
 Naturalization of HK permanent residents who wish to be Chinese citizens
 Issuing Hong Kong Special Administrative Region passport to permanent residents who are Chinese citizens
 Issuing Hong Kong Document of Identity for Visa Purposes for HK residents who can obtain neither a national passport nor Hong Kong passport.

Directors of the Immigration Department (Since 1 July 1997)

 Au Ka-wang (2020-Present)
 Erick Tsang Kwok-wai (2016–2020)
 Eric Chan, (2011-2016)
 Simon Peh, (2008–2011)
 Lai Tung-kwok, (2002–2008)
 Ambrose Lee, (1998 to 2002)
 Regina Ip (July 1997 to 1998)

Application for British National (Overseas) Passport
Prior to the handover of Hong Kong in 1997, the Immigration Department was responsible for processing BN(O) passport applications. After the handover, the UK Government then took over the issue of BN(O) passport.

Ranks

As with all of the HK Disciplined Services, British-pattern ranks and insignia continue to be utilised, the only change being the exchange of the St. Edward's Crown for the Bauhinia Flower crest post-1997. The ranks are listed below with their UK equivalences in brackets:

Director of Immigration (General)
Deputy Director of Immigration (Lieutenant-General)
Assistant Director of Immigration (Major-General)
Senior Principal Immigration Officer (Colonel)
Principal Immigration Officer (Lieutenant-Colonel)
Assistant Principal Immigration Officer (Major)
Chief Immigration Officer (Captain)
Senior Immigration Officer (Lieutenant with a silver bar beneath)
Immigration Officer (Lieutenant)
Immigration Officer (Probationary) (Second Lieutenant) (with effect from 19 April 2010)
Assistant Immigration Officer (Second Lieutenant) (discontinued in November 1998)
Chief Immigration Assistant (three silver bars)
Senior Immigration Assistant (two silver bars)
Immigration Assistant (silver bar)

Visa delays and denials

Taiwan 
In 2005, Ma Ying-jeou was denied a visa by the Immigration Department, despite being born in Hong Kong.

In July 2020, TECO's highest officer in Hong Kong, Kao Ming-tsun, was not granted a renewal of his work visa by the Hong Kong government because he refused to sign a statement supporting the "One China" principle. The Mainland Affairs Council of Taiwan mentioned that other government representatives in TECO had experienced major visa delays from the Hong Kong government as well.

Journalists 
Since 2018, visas for some journalists have been declined by the Immigration Department, including New York Times journalist Chris Buckley and Hong Kong Free Press' incoming editor. In March 2021, the Ombudsman of Hong Kong announced that the Immigration Department was placed under investigation due to the rejection of the visa for the Hong Kong Free Press' incoming editor.

In November 2021, a journalist from The Economist was not granted a renewed visa.

Others 
In February 2020, Elizabeth Ward, Australia's new Consul-General to Hong Kong and Macau, was unable to take up her post due to visa delays, which was attributed to political tensions between Australia and China. In October, she was officially appointed.

In September 2021, SCMP reported that the department denied visas to dozens of Cathay Pacific pilots.

In November 2022, the department withheld the visa of Tim Owen, the lawyer of choice for Jimmy Lai. In December 2022, the visa was rejected.

In December 2022, freelance photographer Michiko Kiseki was not allowed into the city, after hosting an exhibition of photos from the 2019-20 Hong Kong protests.

List of notable activists refused entry to Hong Kong
The department is also tasked with preventing visits by prominent human rights and democracy advocates, upon the direction of the mainland government.

See also

Visa policy of Hong Kong
Hong Kong Police Force
Marine Region
Immigration Ordinance
Boundaries of Hong Kong

References

Order of precedence

External links

Organisation chart of Hong Kong Government

Hong Kong government departments and agencies
Law enforcement agencies of Hong Kong
Immigration services
Immigration to Hong Kong